The  Köppen climate classification is one of the most widely used climate classification systems. It was first published by German-Russian climatologist Wladimir Köppen (1846–1940) in 1884, with several later modifications by Köppen, notably in 1918 and 1936. Later, German climatologist Rudolf Geiger (1894–1981) introduced some changes to the classification system, which is thus sometimes called the Köppen–Geiger climate classification.

The Köppen climate classification divides climates into five main climate groups, with each group being divided based on seasonal precipitation and temperature patterns. The five main groups are A (tropical), B (arid), C (temperate), D (continental), and E (polar). Each group and subgroup is represented by a letter. All climates are assigned a main group (the first letter). All climates except for those in the E group are assigned a seasonal precipitation subgroup (the second letter). For example, Af indicates a tropical rainforest climate. The system assigns a temperature subgroup for all groups other than those in the A group, indicated by the third letter for climates in B, C, D, and the second letter for climates in E. For example, Cfb indicates an oceanic climate with warm summers as indicated by the ending b. Climates are classified based on specific criteria unique to each climate type.

As Köppen designed the system based on his experience as a botanist, his main climate groups are based on what types of vegetation grow in a given climate classification region. In addition to identifying climates, the system can be used to analyze ecosystem conditions and identify the main types of vegetation within climates. Due to its link with the plant life of a given region, the system is useful in predicting future changes in plant life within that region.

The Köppen climate classification system was further modified within the Trewartha climate classification system in the 1966 (revised in 1980). The Trewartha system sought to create a more refined middle latitude climate zone, which was one of the criticisms of the Köppen system (the C climate group was too broad).

Overview 

The Köppen climate classification scheme divides climates into five main climate groups: A (tropical), B (arid), C (temperate), D (continental), and E (polar). The second letter indicates the seasonal precipitation type, while the third letter indicates the level of heat. Summers are defined as the 6-month period that is warmer either from April–September and/or October–March while winter is the 6-month period that is cooler.

Group A: Tropical climates

 Af = Tropical rainforest climate; average precipitation of at least  in every month.

Group B: Arid climates

The threshold in millimeters is determined by multiplying the average annual temperature in Celsius by 20, then adding:
(a) 280 if 70% or more of the total precipitation is in the spring and summer months (April–September in the Northern Hemisphere, or October–March in the Southern), or
(b) 140 if 30%–70% of the total precipitation is received during the spring and summer, or
(c) 0 if less than 30% of the total precipitation is received during the spring and summer.

If the annual precipitation is less than 50% of this threshold, the classification is BW (arid: desert climate); if it is in the range of 50%–100% of the threshold, the classification is BS (semi-arid: steppe climate).

A third letter can be included to indicate temperature. Originally, h signified low-latitude climate (average annual temperature above ) while k signified middle-latitude climate (average annual temperature below 18 °C), but the more common practice today, especially in the United States, is to use h to mean the coldest month has an average temperature above  (or ), with k denoting that at least one month's averages below 0 °C (or ). In addition, n is used to denote a climate characterized by frequent fog and H for high altitudes.
 BWh = Hot desert climate
 BWk = Cold desert climate
 BSh = Hot semi-arid climate
 BSk = Cold semi-arid climate

Group C: Temperate climates

For the distribution of precipitation in locations that both satisfy a dry summer (Cs) and a dry winter (Cw), a location is considered to have a wet summer (Cw) when more precipitation falls within the summer months than the winter months while a location is considered to have a dry summer (Cs) when more precipitation falls within the winter months. This additional criterion applies to locations that satisfies both Ds and Dw as well.
 Cfa = Humid subtropical climate; coldest month averaging above  (or ), at least one month's average temperature above , and at least four months averaging above . No significant precipitation difference between seasons (neither the abovementioned set of conditions fulfilled). No dry months in the summer.
 Cfb = Temperate oceanic climate or subtropical highland climate; coldest month averaging above  (or ), all months with average temperatures below , and at least four months averaging above . No significant precipitation difference between seasons (neither the abovementioned set of conditions fulfilled).
 Cfc = Subpolar oceanic climate; coldest month averaging above  (or ) and 1–3 months averaging above . No significant precipitation difference between seasons (neither the abovementioned set of conditions fulfilled).
 Cwa = Monsoon-influenced humid subtropical climate; coldest month averaging above  (or ), at least one month's average temperature above , and at least four months averaging above . At least ten times as much rain in the wettest month of summer as in the driest month of winter (alternative definition is 70% or more of average annual precipitation is received in the warmest six months).
 Cwb = Subtropical highland climate or Monsoon-influenced temperate oceanic climate; coldest month averaging above  (or ), all months with average temperatures below , and at least four months averaging above . At least ten times as much rain in the wettest month of summer as in the driest month of winter (an alternative definition is 70% or more of average annual precipitation received in the warmest six months).
 Cwc = Cold subtropical highland climate or Monsoon-influenced subpolar oceanic climate; coldest month averaging above  (or ) and 1–3 months averaging above . At least ten times as much rain in the wettest month of summer as in the driest month of winter (alternative definition is 70% or more of average annual precipitation is received in the warmest six months).
 Csa = Hot-summer Mediterranean climate; coldest month averaging above  (or ), at least one month's average temperature above , and at least four months averaging above .
 Csb = Warm-summer Mediterranean climate; coldest month averaging above  (or ), all months with average temperatures below , and at least four months averaging above .
 Csc = Cold-summer Mediterranean climate; coldest month averaging above  (or ) and 1–3 months averaging above .

Group D: Continental climates

This type of climate has at least one month averaging below  (or ) and at least one month averaging above .
 Dfa = Hot-summer humid continental climate; coldest month averaging below  (or ), at least one month's average temperature above , and at least four months averaging above . No significant precipitation difference between seasons (neither the abovementioned set of conditions fulfilled).
 Dfb = Warm-summer humid continental climate; coldest month averaging below  (or ), all months with average temperatures below , and at least four months averaging above . No significant precipitation difference between seasons (neither the abovementioned set of conditions fulfilled).
 Dfc = Subarctic climate; coldest month averaging below  (or ) and 1–3 months averaging above . No significant precipitation difference between seasons (neither the abovementioned set of conditions fulfilled).
 Dfd = Extremely cold subarctic climate; coldest month averaging below  and 1–3 months averaging above . No significant precipitation difference between seasons (neither the abovementioned set of conditions fulfilled).
 Dwa = Monsoon-influenced hot-summer humid continental climate; coldest month averaging below  (or ), at least one month's average temperature above , and at least four months averaging above . At least ten times as much rain in the wettest month of summer as in the driest month of winter (alternative definition is 70% or more of average annual precipitation is received in the warmest six months).
 Dwb = Monsoon-influenced warm-summer humid continental climate; coldest month averaging below  (or ), all months with average temperatures below , and at least four months averaging above . At least ten times as much rain in the wettest month of summer as in the driest month of winter (alternative definition is 70% or more of average annual precipitation is received in the warmest six months).
 Dwc = Monsoon-influenced subarctic climate; coldest month averaging below  (or ) and 1–3 months averaging above . At least ten times as much rain in the wettest month of summer as in the driest month of winter (alternative definition is 70% or more of average annual precipitation is received in the warmest six months).
 Dwd = Monsoon-influenced extremely cold subarctic climate; coldest month averaging below  and 1–3 months averaging above . At least ten times as much rain in the wettest month of summer as in the driest month of winter (alternative definition is 70% or more of average annual precipitation is received in the warmest six months).
 Dsa = Mediterranean-influenced hot-summer humid continental climate; coldest month averaging below  (or ), average temperature of the warmest month above  and at least four months averaging above .
 Dsb = Mediterranean-influenced warm-summer humid continental climate; coldest month averaging below  (or ), average temperature of the warmest month below  and at least four months averaging above .
 Dsc = Mediterranean-influenced subarctic climate; coldest month averaging below  (or ) and 1–3 months averaging above .
 Dsd = Mediterranean-influenced extremely cold subarctic climate; coldest month averaging below  and 1–3 months averaging above .

Group E: Polar and alpine climates

This type of climate has every month of the year with an average temperature below .
 EF = Ice cap climate; eternal winter, with all 12 months of the year with average temperatures below .

Group A: Tropical/mega thermal climates 

Tropical climates are characterized by constant high temperatures (at sea level and low elevations); all 12 months of the year have average temperatures of 18 °C (64.4 °F) or higher; and generally high annual precipitation. They are subdivided as follows:

Af: Tropical rainforest climate 

All 12 months have an average precipitation of at least . These climates usually occur within 10° latitude of the equator. This climate has no natural seasons in terms of thermal and moisture changes. When it is dominated most of the year by the doldrums low-pressure system due to the presence of the Intertropical Convergence Zone (ITCZ) and when there are no cyclones then the climate is qualified as equatorial. When the trade winds dominate most of the year, the climate is a tropical trade-wind rainforest climate.

Examples

 Apia, Samoa (Af)
 Balikpapan, Indonesia (Af)
 Davao, Philippines (Af)
 Fort Lauderdale, Florida, United States (Af, bordering on Am)
 Georgetown, Guyana (Af)
 Hilo, Hawaii, United States (Af)
 Honiara, Solomon Islands (Af)
 Innisfail, Queensland, Australia (Af)
 Ishigaki, Japan (Af)
 Kampala, Uganda (Af)
 Kisumu, Kenya (Af)
 Kuala Lumpur, Malaysia (Af)
 Kuching, Malaysia (Af)
 La Ceiba, Honduras (Af)
 Lae, Papua New Guinea (Af)
 Manaus, Brazil (Af)
 Medan, Indonesia (Af)
 Medellín, Colombia (Af)
 Moroni, Comoros (Af)
 Pago Pago, American Samoa (Af)
 Paramaribo, Suriname (Af)
 Pontianak, Indonesia (Af)
 Port Vila, Vanuatu (Af)
 Quibdó, Colombia (Af)
 Ratnapura, Sri Lanka (Af)
 Salvador da Bahia, Brazil (Af)
 Santos, Brazil (Af)
 Singapore (Af)
 Suva, Fiji (Af)
 Toamasina, Madagascar (Af)
 Victoria, Seychelles (Af)

Some of the places with this climate are indeed uniformly and monotonously wet throughout the year (e.g., the northwest Pacific coast of South and Central America, from Ecuador to Costa Rica; see, for instance, Andagoya, Colombia), but in many cases, the period of higher sun and longer days is distinctly wettest (as at Palembang, Indonesia) or the time of lower sun and shorter days may have more rain (as at Sitiawan, Malaysia).
Among these places, some have a pure equatorial climate (Balikpapan, Kuala Lumpur, Kuching, Lae, Medan, Paramaribo, Pontianak, and Singapore) with the dominant ITCZ aerological mechanism and no cyclones or a subequatorial climate with occasional hurricanes (Davao, Ratnapura, Victoria).

(Note. The term aseasonal refers to the lack in the tropical zone of large differences in daylight hours and mean monthly (or daily) temperature throughout the year. Annual cyclic changes occur in the tropics, but not as predictably as those in the temperate zone, albeit unrelated to temperature, but to water availability whether as rain, mist, soil, or groundwater. Plant response (e. g., phenology), animal (feeding, migration, reproduction, etc.), and human activities (plant sowing, harvesting, hunting, fishing, etc.) are tuned to this 'seasonality'. Indeed, in tropical South America and Central America, the 'rainy season (and the 'high water season') is called  Invierno or Inverno, though it could occur in the Northern Hemisphere summer; likewise, the 'dry season (and 'low water season') is called  Verano or verão, and can occur in the Northern Hemisphere winter).

Am: Tropical monsoon climate 

This type of climate results from the monsoon winds which change direction according to the seasons.

Examples

 Baguio, Philippines (Am, bordering on Cwb)
 Cairns, Queensland, Australia (Am)
 Chittagong, Bangladesh (Am)
 Coatzacoalcos, Veracruz, Mexico (Am)
 Conakry, Guinea (Am)
 Douala, Cameroon (Am)
 Freetown, Sierra Leone (Am)
 Guanare, Venezuela (Am)
 Huế, Thừa Thiên–Huế, Vietnam (Am)
 Jakarta, Indonesia (Am)
 Kochi, Kerala, India (Am)
 Ko Samui, Thailand (Am, bordering on Af)
 Libreville, Gabon (Am)
 Malabo, Equatorial Guinea (Am)
 Malé, Maldives (Am)
 Mangalore, Karnataka, India (Am)
 Miami, Florida, United States (Am)
 Monrovia, Liberia (Am)
 Port Harcourt, Rivers State, Nigeria (Am)
 Puerto Ayacucho, Venezuela (Am)
 Qionghai City, China (Am)
 Recife, Pernambuco, Brazil (Am)
 San Juan, Puerto Rico (Am)
 Santo Domingo, Dominican Republic (Am)
 Taitung, Taiwan (Am)
 Thiruvananthapuram, Kerala, India (Am)
 Yangon, Myanmar (Am)
 Zanzibar City, Tanzania (Am)

Aw/As: Tropical savanna climate

Aw: Tropical savanna climate with dry-winter characteristics 

Examples

 Abidjan, Ivory Coast (Aw)
 Abuja, Nigeria (Aw)
 Bamako, Mali (Aw)
 Bangkok, Thailand (Aw)
 Bangui, Central African Republic (Aw)
 Banjul, The Gambia (Aw)
 Barranquilla, Colombia (Aw)
 Brasília, Brazil (Aw)
 Brazzaville, Republic of the Congo (Aw)
 Bujumbura, Burundi (Aw)
 Cancún, Quintana Roo, Mexico (Aw, bordering on Am)
 Caracas, Venezuela (Aw)
 Cartagena, Colombia (Aw)
 Chennai, Tamil Nadu, India (Aw)
 Cotonou, Benin (Aw)
 Dar es Salaam, Tanzania (Aw)
 Darwin, Northern Territory, Australia (Aw)
 Dhaka, Bangladesh (Aw)
 Dili, East Timor (Aw)
 Guatemala City, Guatemala (Aw, bordering on Cwb)
 Guayaquil, Ecuador (Aw)
 Havana, Cuba (Aw, bordering on Am)
 Ho Chi Minh City, Vietnam (Aw)
 Kano, Nigeria (Aw)
 Kaohsiung, Taiwan (Aw)
 Key West, Florida, United States (Aw)
 Kigali, Rwanda (Aw)
 Kingston, Jamaica (Aw)
 Kinshasa, Democratic Republic of Congo (Aw)
 Kolkata, West Bengal, India (Aw)
 Kumasi, Ghana (Aw)
 Kupang, Indonesia (Aw)
 Lagos, Lagos State, Nigeria (Aw)
 Lomé, Togo (Aw) 
 Mumbai, Maharashtra, India (Aw)
 Naples, Florida, United States (Aw)
 Panamá City, Panamá (Aw)
 Phnom Penh, Cambodia (Aw)
 Port-au-Prince, Haiti (Aw)
 Port Moresby, Papua New Guinea (Aw)
 Port of Spain, Trinidad and Tobago (Aw)
 Rio de Janeiro, Brazil (Aw, bordering on Am)
 San Pedro Sula, Honduras (Aw, bordering on Am)
 San Salvador, El Salvador (Aw)
 Santa Cruz de la Sierra, Bolivia (Aw)
 Sanya, Hainan, China (Aw)
 Surabaya, Indonesia (Aw)
 Tegucigalpa, Honduras (Aw)
 Townsville, Queensland, Australia (Aw)
 Veracruz, Veracruz, Mexico (Aw)
 Vientiane, Laos (Aw)
 Yaoundé, Cameroon (Aw)

Most places that have this climate are found at the outer margins of the tropical zone from the low teens to the mid-20s latitudes, but occasionally an inner-tropical location (e.g., San Marcos, Antioquia, Colombia) also qualifies. The Caribbean coast, eastward from the Gulf of Urabá on the Colombia–Panamá border to the Orinoco River delta, on the Atlantic Ocean (about 4,000  km), have long dry periods (the extreme is the BSh climate (see below), characterized by very low, unreliable precipitation, present, for instance, in extensive areas in the Guajira, and Coro, western Venezuela, the northernmost peninsulas in South America, which receive <300  mm total annual precipitation, practically all in two or three months).

This condition extends to the Lesser Antilles and Greater Antilles forming the circum-Caribbean dry belt. The length and severity of the dry season diminish inland (southward); at the latitude of the Amazon River—which flows eastward, just south of the equatorial line—the climate is Af. East from the Andes, between the dry, arid Caribbean and the ever-wet Amazon are the Orinoco River's Llanos or savannas, from where this climate takes its name.

As: Tropical savanna climate with dry-summer characteristics 

Sometimes As is used in place of Aw if the dry season occurs during the time of higher sun and longer days (during summer). This is the case in parts of Hawaii, northwestern Dominican Republic, East Africa, and the Brazilian Northeastern Coast. In most places that have tropical wet and dry climates, however, the dry season occurs during the time of lower sun and shorter days because of rain shadow effects during the 'high-sun' part of the year.

Examples

 Cali, Colombia (As)
 Cape Coast, Ghana (As)
 Fortaleza, Brazil (As)
 Jaffna, Sri Lanka (As)
 Lanai City, Hawaii, Hawaii, United States (As)
 Mombasa, Kenya (As)
 Monte Cristi, Dominican Republic (As)
 Natal, Rio Grande do Norte, Brazil (As)
 Nha Trang, Vietnam (As)
 São Tomé, São Tomé and Principe (As)
 Trincomalee, Sri Lanka (As)

Group B: Arid (desert and semi-arid) climates 

These climates are characterized by the amount of annual precipitation less than a threshold value that approximates the potential evapotranspiration. The threshold value (in millimeters) is calculated as follows:

Multiply the average annual temperature in °C by 20, then add

According to the modified Köppen classification system used by modern climatologists, total precipitation in the warmest six months of the year is taken as a reference instead of the total precipitation in the high-sun half of the year.

If the annual precipitation is less than 50% of this threshold, the classification is BW (arid: desert climate); if it is in the range of 50%–100% of the threshold, the classification is BS (semi-arid: steppe climate).

A third letter can be included to indicate temperature. Originally, h signified low-latitude climate (average annual temperature above 18 °C) while k signified middle-latitude climate (average annual temperature below 18 °C), but the more common practice today, especially in the United States, is to use h to mean the coldest month has an average temperature above 0 °C (32 °F) (or ), with k denoting that at least one month averages below 0 °C.

Desert areas situated along the west coasts of continents at tropical or near-tropical locations characterized by frequent fog and low clouds, although these places rank among the driest on earth in terms of actual precipitation received are labeled BWn with the n denoting a climate characterized by frequent fog. The BSN category can be found in foggy coastal steppes.

BW: Arid climate

Hot desert 

 ʽAziziya, Jafara, Libya (BWh)
 Ahvaz, Iran (BWh)
 Alexandria, Egypt (BWh)
 Alice Springs, Australia (BWh)
 Almería, Andalusia, Spain (BWh, bordering on BSh)
 Baghdad, Iraq (BWh)
 Cairo, Egypt (BWh)
 Coober Pedy, Australia (BWh)
 Death Valley, California, United States (BWh), location of the hottest air temperature ever recorded on Earth
 Djibouti City, Djibouti (BWh)
 Doha, Qatar (BWh)
 Dubai, United Arab Emirates (BWh)
 Eilat, Southern District, Israel (BWh)
 Hermosillo, Sonora, Mexico (BWh)
 Karachi, Pakistan (BWh)
 Khartoum, Sudan (BWh)
 Kuwait City, Kuwait (BWh)
 Las Palmas, Canary Islands, Spain (BWh)
 Las Vegas, Nevada, United States (BWh)
 Lima, Peru (BWh)
 Mecca, Makkah Region, Saudi Arabia (BWh)
 Muscat, Oman (BWh)
 Nouakchott, Mauritania (BWh)
 Phoenix, Arizona, United States (BWh)
 Riyadh, Saudi Arabia (BWh)
 Timbuktu, Mali (BWh)
 Upington, Northern Cape, South Africa (BWh)
 Yazd, Iran (BWh)
 Zahedan, Iran (BWh)

Cold desert 

 Albuquerque, New Mexico, United States (BWk, bordering on BSk)
 Antofagasta, Chile (BWk)
 Aral, Kazakhstan (BWk)
 Ashgabat, Turkmenistan (BWk)
 Ciudad Juárez, Chihuahua, Mexico (BWk, bordering on BWh)
 Damascus, Syria (BWk)
 Isfahan, Iran (BWk)
 Kerman, Iran (BWk)
 Leh, India (BWk)
 Neuquén, Argentina (BWk)
 Nukus, Uzbekistan (BWk)
 Saint George, Utah, United States (BWk, bordering on BWh)
 San Juan, Argentina (BWk, bordering on BWh)
 Sanaa, Yemen (BWk, bordering on BSk)
 Turpan, Xinjiang, China (BWk)
 Walvis Bay, Erongo Region, Namibia (BWk)
 Yakima, Washington, United States (BWk, bordering on BSk)

BS: Semi-arid (steppe) climate

Hot semi-arid 

 Accra, Ghana (BSh, bordering on Aw)
 Alicante, Spain (BSh, bordering on BSk)
 Amman, Amman Governorate, Jordan (BSh)
 Barquisimeto, Venezuela (BSh)
 Coimbatore, Tamil Nadu, India (BSh)
 Dakar, Senegal (BSh)
 Honolulu, Hawaii, United States (BSh)
 Jodhpur, India (BSh)
 Kimberley, Northern Cape, South Africa (BSh)
 Kurnool, Andhra Pradesh, India (BSh)
 Lahore, Punjab, Pakistan (BSh)
 Lampedusa, Sicily, Italy (BSh)
 Luanda, Angola (BSh)
 Mandalay, Myanmar (BSh, bordering on Aw)
 Maputo, Mozambique (BSh)
 Maracaibo, Venezuela (BSh)
 Marrakesh, Morocco (BSh)
 Mogadishu, Somalia (BSh)
 Monterrey, Mexico (BSh, bordering on Cwa)
 Mount Isa, Queensland, Australia (BSh)
 N'Djamena, Chad (BSh)
 Nicosia, Cyprus (BSh)
 Odessa, Texas, United States (BSh)
 Oranjestad, Aruba (BSh)
 Ouagadougou, Burkina Faso (BSh)
 Petrolina, Pernambuco, Brazil (BSh)
 Patos, Paraíba, Brazil (BSh)
 Piraeus, Greece (BSh)
 Port Louis, Mauritius (BSh)
 Querétaro City, Querétaro, Mexico (BSh)
 Santa Cruz de Tenerife, Canary Islands, Spain (BSh)
 Toliara, Madagascar (BSh)
 Tripoli, Libya (BSh)
 Windhoek, Namibia (BSh)

Cold semi-arid 

 Aleppo, Syria (BSk)
 Alexandra, New Zealand (BSk, bordering on Cfb)
 Asmara, Eritrea (BSk)
 Astrakhan, Russia (BSk)
 Baku, Azerbaijan (BSk)
 Boise, Idaho, United States (BSk)
 Comodoro Rivadavia, Argentina (BSk)
 Denver, Colorado, United States (BSk)
 Kabul, Afghanistan (BSk)
 Kalgoorlie, Western Australia, Australia (BSk)
 Kamloops, British Columbia, Canada (BSk)
 Konya, Turkey (BSk)
 L'Agulhas, Western Cape, South Africa (BSk)
 La Quiaca, Jujuy, Argentina (BSk)
 Lethbridge, Alberta, Canada (BSk)
 Mashhad, Iran (BSk)
 Mildura, Victoria, Australia (BSk, bordering on BSh)
 Oral, Kazakhstan (BSk)
 Quetta, Pakistan (BSk)
 Reno, Nevada, United States (BSk)
 Saskatoon, Saskatchewan, Canada (BSk, bordering on Dfb)
 Shijiazhuang, Hebei, China (BSk)
 Tabriz, Iran (BSk, bordering on Dsa)
 Tehran, Iran (BSk, bordering on Csa)
 Tianjin, China (BSk, bordering on Dwa)
 Ulaanbaatar, Mongolia (BSk, bordering on Dwb)
 Ulan-Ude, Russia (BSk)
 Yerevan, Armenia (BSk, bordering on Dfa)
 Zacatecas City, Zacatecas, Mexico (BSk)
 Zaragoza, Spain (BSk)

Group C: Temperate/mesothermal climates 

The average temperature of  roughly coincides with the equatorward limit of frozen ground and snow cover lasting for a month or more.

The second letter indicates the precipitation pattern—w indicates dry winters (driest winter month average precipitation less than one-tenth wettest summer month average precipitation). s indicates at least three times as much rain in the wettest month of winter as in the driest month of summer. f means significant precipitation in all seasons (neither above-mentioned set of conditions fulfilled).

The third letter indicates the degree of summer heat—a indicates warmest month average temperature above  while b indicates warmest month averaging below 22 °C but with at least four months averaging above , and c indicates one to three months averaging above .

Csa: Mediterranean hot summer climates 

These climates usually occur on the western sides of continents between the latitudes of 30° and 45°. These climates are in the polar front region in winter, and thus have moderate temperatures and changeable, rainy weather. Summers are hot and dry, due to the domination of the subtropical high-pressure systems, except in the immediate coastal areas, where summers are milder due to the nearby presence of cold ocean currents that may bring fog but prevent rain.

Examples

 Adelaide, Australia (Csa)
 Algiers, Algeria (Csa)
 Antalya, Turkey (Csa)
 Athens, Greece (Csa, bordering on BSh)
 Barcelona, Spain (Csa, bordering on Cfa)
 Beirut, Lebanon (Csa)
 Casablanca, Morocco (Csa)
 Dushanbe, Tajikistan (Csa)
 Faro, Portugal (Csa)
 Izmir, Turkey (Csa)
 Jerusalem, Israel (Csa)
 Kermanshah, Iran (Csa)
 Latakia, Syria (Csa)
 Lisbon, Portugal (Csa)
 Los Angeles, California, United States (Csa, bordering on BSh)
 Madrid, Spain (Csa, bordering on BSk)
 Marseille, France (Csa)
 Mersin, Turkey (Csa)
 Monaco (Csa)
 Naples, Italy (Csa, bordering on Cfa)
 Nice, France (Csa)
 Palma de Mallorca, Spain (Csa)
 Perth, Australia (Csa)
 Rome, Italy (Csa)
 Sacramento, California, United States (Csa)
 Tangier, Morocco (Csa)
 Tashkent, Uzbekistan (Csa, bordering on BSk)
 Tecate, Baja California, Mexico (Csa)
 Tel Aviv, Israel (Csa)
 Tunis, Tunisia (Csa)
 Valletta, Malta (Csa)
 Vatican City (Csa)

Csb: Mediterranean warm/cool summer climates 
Dry-summer climates sometimes extend to additional areas (sometimes well north or south of) typical Mediterranean climates, however since their warmest month average temperatures do not reach  they are classified as Csb. Some of these areas would border the oceanic climate (Cfb), except their dry-summer patterns meet Köppen's Cs minimum thresholds.

Examples

 Albany, Western Australia, Australia (Csb)
 Bayda, Libya (Csb)
 Cape Town, South Africa (Csb)
 Concepción, Chile (Csb)
 Guarda, Portugal (Csb)
 Linares, Chile (Csb)
 Mount Gambier, South Australia, Australia (Csb)
 Nakuru, Kenya (Csb)
 Nanaimo, British Columbia, Canada (Csb)
 Ohrid, North Macedonia (Csb)
 Porto, Portugal (Csb)
 Rieti, Italy (Csb)
 Salamanca, Spain (Csb)
 San Carlos de Bariloche, Argentina (Csb)
 San Cristóbal de la Laguna, Spain (Csb)
 San Francisco, California, United States (Csb)
 Santa Barbara, California, United States (Csb)
 Seattle, Washington, United States (Csb)
 Sintra, Portugal (Csb)
 Victoria, British Columbia, Canada (Csb)

Csc: Mediterranean cold summer climates 
Cold summer Mediterranean climates (Csc) exist in high-elevation areas adjacent to coastal Csb climate areas, where the strong maritime influence prevents the average winter monthly temperature from dropping below 0 °C. This climate is rare and is predominantly found in climate fringes and isolated areas of the Cascades and Andes Mountains, as the dry-summer climate extends further poleward in the Americas than elsewhere. Rare instances of this climate can be found in some coastal locations in the North Atlantic and at high altitudes in Hawaii.

Examples

 Akureyri, Iceland (Csc), alternatively: dry-summer subarctic climate (Dsc)
 Balmaceda, Chile (Csc)
 Government Camp, Oregon, United States (Csc, bordering on Dsb and Dsc)
 Haleakalā Summit, Hawaii, United States (Csc)
 Harstad, Norway (Csc), alternatively: dry-summer subarctic climate (Dsc)
 Liawenee, Australia (Csc, bordering on Csb)
 Spirit Lake, Washington, United States (Csc)

Cfa: Humid subtropical climates 

These climates usually occur on the eastern coasts and eastern sides of continents, usually in the high 20s and 30s latitudes. Unlike the dry summer Mediterranean climates, humid subtropical climates have a warm and wet flow from the tropics that creates warm and moist conditions in the summer months. As such, summer (not winter as is the case in Mediterranean climates) is often the wettest season.

The flow out of the subtropical highs and the summer monsoon creates a southerly flow from the tropics that brings warm and moist air to the lower east sides of continents. This flow is often what brings the frequent but short-lived summer thundershowers so typical of the more southerly subtropical climates like the southern United States, southern China, and Japan.

Examples

 Asunción, Paraguay (Cfa, bordering on Aw)
 Atlanta, Georgia, United States (Cfa)
 Bandar-e Anzali, Iran (Cfa)
 Buenos Aires, Argentina (Cfa)
 Belgrade, Serbia (Cfa)
 Bologna, Italy (Cfa)
 Brisbane, Australia (Cfa)
 Budapest, Hungary (Cfa)
 Chongqing, China (Cfa, bordering on Cwa)
 Durban, South Africa (Cfa)
 Florianópolis, Brazil (Cfa)
 Guangzhou, China (Cfa)
 Jeju, South Korea (Cfa)
 Krasnodar, Russia (Cfa)
 La Plata, Argentina (Cfa)
 Lugano, Switzerland (Cfa, bordering on Cfb)
 Lyon, France (Cfa, bordering on Cfb)
 Matamoros, Tamaulipas, Mexico (Cfa, bordering on Aw)
 Milan, Italy (Cfa)
 Montevideo, Uruguay (Cfa)
 New York City, New York, United States (Cfa, bordering on Dfa)
 Odesa, Ukraine (Cfa, bordering on Dfa and BSk)
 Orlando, Florida, United States (Cfa)
 Osaka, Japan (Cfa)
 Porto Alegre, Brazil (Cfa)
 Rasht, Iran (Cfa)
 Rosario, Argentina (Cfa, bordering on Cwa)
 Samsun, Turkey (Cfa)
 San Marino (Cfa, bordering on Cfb)
 São Paulo, Brazil (Cfa, bordering on Cwa)
 Sari, Iran (Cfa)
 Shanghai, China (Cfa)
 Sochi, Russia (Cfa)
 Split, Croatia (Cfa, bordering on Csa)
 Srinagar, India (Cfa)
 Sydney, Australia (Cfa)
 Taipei, Taiwan (Cfa, bordering on Cwa)
 Tbilisi, Georgia (Cfa)
 Tirana, Albania (Cfa)
 Tokyo, Japan (Cfa)
 Toulouse, France (Cfa)
 Ulsan, South Korea (Cfa)
 Venice, Italy (Cfa) 
 Yokohama, Japan (Cfa)

Cfb: Oceanic climate

Marine west coast climate 
Cfb climates usually occur in the higher middle latitudes on the western sides of continents between the latitudes of 40° and 60°; they are typically situated immediately poleward of the Mediterranean climates. However, in southeast Australia, southeast South America, and extreme southern Africa this climate is found immediately poleward of temperate climates, on places near the coast and at a somewhat lower latitude. In western Europe, this climate occurs in coastal areas up to 68°N in Norway.

These climates are dominated all year round by the polar front, leading to changeable, often overcast weather. Summers are mild due to cool ocean currents. Winters are milder than other climates in similar latitudes, but usually very cloudy, and frequently wet. Cfb climates are also encountered at high elevations in certain subtropical and tropical areas, where the climate would be that of a subtropical/tropical rainforest if not for the altitude. These climates are called "highlands".

Examples

 Amsterdam, North Holland, Netherlands (Cfb)
 Auckland, New Zealand (Cfb)
 Belfast, Northern Ireland, United Kingdom (Cfb)
 Bergen, Vestland, Norway (Cfb)
 Berlin, Germany (Cfb)
 Bern, Switzerland (Cfb, bordering on Dfb)
 Bilbao, Spain (Cfb)
 Block Island, Rhode Island, United States (Cfb, bordering on Dfb)
 Bordeaux, France (Cfb)
 Bratislava, Slovakia (Cfb, bordering on Dfb)
 Brussels, Belgium (Cfb)
 Christchurch, New Zealand (Cfb)
 Copenhagen, Denmark (Cfb)
 Corvo Island, Azores, Portugal (Cfb, bordering on Cfa)
 Dublin, Ireland (Cfb)
 Forks, Washington, United States (Cfb)
 Frankfurt, Germany (Cfb)
 George, Western Cape, South Africa (Cfb)
 Glasgow, Scotland, United Kingdom (Cfb)
 Hobart, Tasmania, Australia (Cfb)
 Ketchikan, Alaska, United States (Cfb)
 Ljubljana, Slovenia (Cfb, bordering on Dfb)
 London, England, United Kingdom (Cfb)
 Luxembourg City, Luxembourg (Cfb)
 Malmö, Sweden (Cfb)
 Mar del Plata, Buenos Aires, Argentina (Cfb)
 Melbourne, Victoria, Australia (Cfb)
 Munich, Bavaria, Germany (Cfb, bordering on Dfb)
 Ørland, Trøndelag, Norway (Cfb)
 Osorno, Los Lagos Region, Chile (Cfb)
 Paris, France (Cfb)
 Penticton, British Columbia, Canada (Cfb, bordering on Dfb and BSk)
 Port Elizabeth, South Africa (Cfb)
 Prague, Czech Republic (Cfb, bordering on Dfb)
 Prince Rupert, British Columbia, Canada (Cfb)
 Puerto Montt, Los Lagos Region, Chile (Cfb)
 Punta del Este, Uruguay (Cfb, bordering on Cfa)
 Santander, Spain (Cfb)
 Santiago de Compostela, Spain (Cfb)
 Sarajevo, Bosnia and Herzegovina (Cfb, bordering on Dfb)
 Skagen, Denmark (Cfb)
 Sofia, Bulgaria (Cfb, bordering on Dfb)
 Vaduz, Liechtenstein (Cfb)
 Valdivia, Los Ríos Region, Chile (Cfb)
 Vancouver, British Columbia, Canada (Cfb, bordering on Csb)
 Vienna, Austria (Cfb)
 Wellington, New Zealand (Cfb)
 Wollongong, New South Wales, Australia (Cfb, bordering on Cfa)
 Zagreb, Croatia (Cfb, bordering on Dfb)
 Zonguldak, Turkey (Cfb, bordering on Cfa)
 Zürich, Switzerland (Cfb, bordering on Dfb)

Subtropical highland climate with uniform rainfall 

Subtropical highland climates with uniform rainfall (Cfb) are a type of oceanic climate mainly found in the highlands of Australia, such as in or around the Great Dividing Range in the north of the state of New South Wales, and also sparsely in other continents, such as in South America, among others. Unlike a typical Cwb climate, they tend to have rainfall spread evenly throughout the year. They have characteristics of both the Cfb and Cfa climates, but unlike these climates, they have a high diurnal temperature variation and low humidity, owing to their inland location and relatively high elevation.

Examples

 Bogotá, Colombia (Cfb)
 Boone, North Carolina, United States (Cfb, bordering on Dfb)
 Cameron Highlands, Malaysia (Cfb)
 Chachapoyas, Peru (Cfb)
 Cobán, Guatemala (Cfb)
 Constanza, Dominican Republic (Cfb)
 Cuenca, Ecuador (Cfb)
 Curitiba, Paraná, Brazil (Cfb)
 Eldoret, Kenya (Cfb)
 Kodaikanal, India (Cfb)
 Le Tampon, Réunion, France (Cfb)
 Lithgow, New South Wales, Australia (Cfb)
 Manizales, Colombia (Cfb)
 Maseru, Lesotho (Cfb, bordering on Cwb)
 Mthatha, South Africa (Cfb)
 Nuwara Eliya, Sri Lanka (Cfb)
 Quito, Pichincha, Ecuador (Cfb)
 Sa Pa, Vietnam (Cfb)
 Teresópolis, Rio de Janeiro, Brazil (Cfb)
 Xalapa, Veracruz, Mexico (Cfb, bordering on Cfa)

Cfc: Subpolar oceanic climate 
Subpolar oceanic climates (Cfc) occur poleward of or at higher elevations than the maritime temperate climates and are mostly confined either to narrow coastal strips on the western poleward margins of the continents, or, especially in the Northern Hemisphere, to islands off such coasts. They occur in both hemispheres, most often at latitudes from 60° north and south to 70° north and south.

Examples

 Auckland Islands, New Zealand (Cfc)
 Karlsøy, Norway (Cfc)
 Miena, Tasmania, Australia (Cfc)
 Punta Arenas, Chile (Cfc)
 Reykjavík, Iceland (Cfc)
 Río Grande, Tierra del Fuego, Argentina (Cfc)
 Río Turbio, Santa Cruz, Argentina (Cfc)
 Røst, Norway (Cfc)
 Tórshavn, Faroe Islands (Cfc)
 Unalaska, Alaska, United States (Cfc)

Cwa: Dry-winter humid subtropical climate
Cwa is monsoonal influenced, having the classic dry winter–wet summer pattern associated with tropical monsoonal climates. They are found at similar latitudes as the Cfa climates, except in regions where monsoons are more prevalent.

Examples

 Busan, South Korea (Cwa)
 Campinas, Brazil (Cwa, bordering on Aw)
 Chengdu, Sichuan, China (Cwa)
 Córdoba, Argentina (Cwa)
 Cuernavaca, Mexico (Cwa)
 Delhi, India (Cwa, bordering on BSh)
 Guadalajara, Jalisco, Mexico (Cwa)
 Guwahati, India (Cwa)
 Haikou, China (Cwa)
 Hanoi, Vietnam (Cwa)
 Hong Kong (Cwa)
 Islamabad, Pakistan (Cwa)
 Kathmandu, Nepal (Cwa)
 Lilongwe, Malawi (Cwa)
 Lubumbashi, Democratic Republic of Congo (Cwa)
 Lucknow, India (Cwa)
 Lusaka, Zambia (Cwa)
 Macau (Cwa)
 Mackay, Queensland, Australia (Cwa)
 Pretoria, South Africa (Cwa)
 Rangpur, Bangladesh (Cwa)
 Santiago del Estero, Argentina (Cwa)
 Sialkot, Pakistan (Cwa)
 Siguatepeque, Honduras (Cwa)
 Taunggyi, Myanmar (Cwa)
 Tucumán, Argentina (Cwa)
 Yeosu, South Korea (Cwa)
 Zapopan, Mexico (Cwa)
 Zhengzhou, China (Cwa)

Cwb: Dry-winter subtropical highland climate  
Dry-winter subtropical highland climate (Cwb) is a type of climate mainly found in highlands inside the tropics of Central America, South America, Africa, and Asia or areas in the subtropics. Winters are noticeable and dry, and summers can be very rainy. In the tropics, the monsoon is provoked by the tropical air masses and the dry winters by subtropical high pressure.

Examples

 Addis Ababa, Ethiopia (Cwb)
 Antananarivo, Madagascar (Cwb)
 Arusha, Tanzania (Cwb)
 Cajamarca, Peru (Cwb)
 Cherrapunji, India (Cwb)
 Cusco, Peru (Cwb)
 Da Lat, Vietnam (Cwb)
 Dali City, China (Cwb)
 Diamantina, Brazil (Cwb)
 Gangtok, India (Cwb)
 Hakha, Myanmar (Cwb)
 Harare, Zimbabwe (Cwb)
 Johannesburg, South Africa (Cwb)
 Kunming, China (Cwb)
 La Esperanza, Honduras (Cwb)
 Lhasa, Tibet Autonomous Region, China (Cwb, bordering on Dwb and BSk)
 Mbabane, Eswatini (Cwb)
 Mexico City, Mexico (Cwb)
 Mokhotlong, Lesotho (Cwb)
 Nairobi, Kenya (Cwb)
 Quetzaltenango, Guatemala (Cwb)
 Salta, Argentina (Cwb)
 Shimla, India (Cwb)
 Thimphu, Bhutan (Cwb)
 Vereeniging, South Africa (Cwb, bordering on Cwa)

Cwc: Dry-winter cold subtropical highland climate 
Dry-winter cold subtropical highland climates (Cwc) exist in high-elevation areas adjacent to Cwb climates. This climate is rare and is found mainly in isolated locations mostly in the Andes in Bolivia and Peru, as well as in sparse mountain locations in Southeast Asia.

 El Alto, Bolivia (Cwc, bordering on ET)
 Juliaca, Peru (Cwc, bordering on ET)
 La Paz, Bolivia (Cwc, bordering on ET)
 Mount Pulag, Philippines (Cwc, bordering on ET and Cwb)
 Potosí, Bolivia  (Cwc, bordering on ET)

Group D: Continental/microthermal climates 

These usually occur in the interiors of continents and on their upper east coasts, normally north of 40°N. In the Southern Hemisphere, group D climates are extremely rare due to the smaller land masses in the middle latitudes and the almost complete absence of land at 40–60°S, existing only in some highland locations.

Dfa/Dwa/Dsa: Hot summer continental climates 

In Europe, these climates tend to be much drier than in North America. Dsa exists at higher elevations adjacent to areas with hot summer Mediterranean (Csa) climates.

These climates exist only in the northern hemisphere because the southern hemisphere has no large landmasses isolated from the moderating effects of the sea within the middle latitudes.

Examples

 Almaty, Kazakhstan (Dfa)
 Boston, Massachusetts, United States (Dfa, bordering on Cfa)
 Bucharest, Romania (Dfa, bordering on Cfa)
 Cheonan, South Korea (Dfa, bordering on Dwa)
 Chicago, Illinois, United States (Dfa)
 Chișinău, Moldova (Dfa)
 Dnipro, Ukraine (Dfa, bordering on Dfb)
 Hamilton, Ontario, Canada (Dfa, bordering on Dfb)
 Minneapolis, Minnesota, United States (Dfa)
 Rostov-on-Don, Russia (Dfa)
 Sapporo, Japan (Dfa, bordering on Dfb)
 Toronto, Ontario, Canada (Dfa, bordering on Dfb)
 Urmia, Iran (Dfa, bordering on BSk)
 Ürümqi, Xinjiang, China (Dfa, bordering on BSk)
 Volgograd, Russia (Dfa)
 Windsor, Ontario, Canada (Dfa)

In eastern Asia, Dwa climates extend further south due to the influence of the Siberian high-pressure system, which also causes winters there to be dry, and summers can be very wet because of monsoon circulation.

Examples

 Beijing, China (Dwa, bordering on BSk)
 Chuncheon, Gangwon Province, South Korea (Dwa)
 Harbin, China (Dwa)
 Incheon, South Korea (Dwa, bordering on Cwa)
 North Platte, Nebraska, United States (Dwa, bordering on Dfa and BSk)
 Pyongyang, North Korea (Dwa)
 Seoul, South Korea (Dwa, bordering on Cwa)
 Shenyang, China (Dwa)

Dsa exists only at higher elevations adjacent to areas with hot summer Mediterranean (Csa) climates.

Examples

 Arak, Iran (Dsa)
 Bishkek, Kyrgyzstan (Dsa)
 Hakkâri, Turkey (Dsa)
 Hamedan, Iran (Dsa)
 Muş, Turkey (Dsa)
 Salt Lake City, Utah, United States (Dsa, bordering on Csa)
 Saqqez, Iran (Dsa)
 Shymkent, Kazakhstan (Dsa, bordering on Csa)

Dfb/Dwb/Dsb: Warm summer continental or hemiboreal climates 

Dfb climates are immediately poleward of hot summer continental climates, generally in the high 40s and low 50s latitudes in North America and Asia, and also extending to higher latitudes in central and eastern Europe and Russia, between the maritime temperate and continental subarctic climates, where it extends up to 65 degrees latitude in places.

Examples

 Ardebil, Iran (Dfb, bordering on BSk)
 Ardahan, Turkey (Dfb)
 Chamonix, France (Dfb)
 Cortina d'Ampezzo, Italy (Dfb)
 Edmonton, Alberta, Canada (Dfb)
 Erzurum, Turkey (Dfb)
 Fairbanks, Alaska, United States (Dfb, bordering on Dfc)
 Helsinki, Finland (Dfb)
 Karaganda, Kazakhstan (Dfb)
 Kushiro, Hokkaido, Japan (Dfb)
 Kyiv, Ukraine (Dfb)
 Lillehammer, Norway (Dfb)
 Marquette, Michigan, United States (Dfb)
 Minsk, Belarus (Dfb)
 Montreal, Quebec, Canada (Dfb)
 Moscow, Russia (Dfb)
 Novosibirsk, Russia (Dfb)
 Oslo, Norway (Dfb)
 Ottawa, Ontario, Canada (Dfb)
 Portland, Maine, United States (Dfb)
 Pristina, Kosovo (Dfb, bordering on Cfb and Cfa)
 Riga, Latvia (Dfb)
 Saint Petersburg, Russia (Dfb)
 Stockholm, Sweden (Dfb)
 Tallinn, Estonia (Dfb)
 Vilnius, Lithuania (Dfb)
 Warsaw, Poland (Dfb, bordering on Cfb)

Like with all Group D climates, Dwb climates mostly only occur in the northern hemisphere.

Examples

 Baruunturuun, Mongolia (Dwb)
 Calgary, Alberta, Canada (Dwb, bordering on Dfb and BSk)
 Heihe, China (Dwb)
 Irkutsk, Russia (Dwb, bordering on Dwc)
 Pembina, North Dakota, United States (Dwb, bordering on Dfb)
 Pyeongchang, South Korea (Dwb)
 Vladivostok, Russia (Dwb)
 Yanji, China (Dwb)

Dsb arises from the same scenario as Dsa, but at even higher altitudes or latitudes, and chiefly in North America, since the Mediterranean climates extend further poleward than in Eurasia.

Examples

 Dras, India (Dsb)
 Flagstaff, Arizona, United States (Dsb, bordering on Csb)
 Roghun, Tajikistan (Dsb)
 Sivas, Turkey (Dsb)
 South Lake Tahoe, California, United States (Dsb, bordering on Csb)
 Spokane, Washington, United States (Dsb, bordering on Dsa and Csb)

Dfc/Dwc/Dsc: Subarctic or boreal climates 

Dfc, Dsc and Dwc climates occur poleward of the other group D climates, or at higher altitudes, generally between the 55° to 65° North latitudes, occasionally reaching up to the 70°N latitude.

Examples:

 Alta, Norway (Dfc)
 Anadyr, Russia (Dfc)
 Anchorage, Alaska, United States (Dfc)
 Arkhangelsk, Russia (Dfc)
 Bodie, California, United States (Dsc, bordering on Dsb)
 Charlotte Pass, Australia (Dfc)
 Chita, Russia (Dwc)
 Delta Junction, Alaska, United States (Dwc, bordering on BSk)
 Fraser, Colorado, United States (Dfc)
 Kangerlussuaq, Greenland (Dfc, bordering on ET and BSk)
 Kuujjuarapik, Quebec, Canada (Dfc)
 Labrador City, Newfoundland and Labrador, Canada (Dfc)
 Livigno, Italy (Dfc)
 Lukla, Nepal (Dwc)
 Luleå, Sweden (Dfc)
 Mohe, Heilongjiang, China (Dwc)
 Norilsk, Russia (Dfc)
 Nyurba, Russia (Dfc, bordering on Dfd)
 Oulu, Finland (Dfc)
 Røros, Norway (Dfc)
 Saint Pierre and Miquelon, France (Dfc, bordering on Dfb)
 Sarıkamış, Turkey (Dfc)
 Soldotna, Alaska, United States (Dsc)
 St. Moritz, Grisons, Switzerland (Dfc)
 Tampere, Finland (Dfc, bordering on Dfb)
 Thompson, Manitoba, Canada (Dfc)
 Tromsø, Norway (Dfc)
 Whitehorse, Yukon, Canada (Dfc)
 Yellowknife, Northwest Territories, Canada (Dfc)
 Yushu City, Qinghai, China (Dwc)

Dfd/Dwd/Dsd: Subarctic or boreal climates with severe winters
Places with this climate have severe winters, with the temperature in their coldest month lower than −38 °C. These climates occur only in eastern Siberia. The names of some of the places with this climate have become veritable synonyms for the extreme, severe winter cold.

Examples

 Allakh-Yun, Sakha Republic, Russia (Dwd)
 Delyankir, Sakha Republic, Russia (Dwd)
 Khonuu, Sakha Republic, Russia (Dfd)
 Okhotsky-Perevoz, Sakha Republic, Russia (Dfd)
 Oymyakon, Sakha Republic, Russia (Dwd)
 Verkhoyansk, Sakha Republic, Russia (Dfd)

Group E: Polar climates 

In the Köppen climate system, polar climates are defined as the warmest temperature of any month being below 10 °C (50 °F). Polar climates are further divided into two types, tundra climates and icecap climates:

ET: Tundra climate 
Tundra climate (ET): Warmest month has an average temperature between 0 and 10 °C. These climates occur on the northern edges of the North American and Eurasian land masses (generally north of 70 °N although they may be found farther south depending on local conditions), and on nearby islands. ET climates are also found on some islands near the Antarctic Convergence, and at high elevations outside the polar regions, above the tree line.

Examples

 Alert, Nunavut, Canada (ET, bordering on EF)
 Ben Nevis, Scotland, United Kingdom (ET)
 Cairn Gorm, Scotland, United Kingdom (ET)
 Campbell Island, New Zealand (ET)
 Crozet Islands (ET)
 Dikson Island, Russia (ET)
 Esperanza Base, Antarctica (ET)
 Finse, Norway (ET)
 Ilulissat, Greenland (ET)
 Inukjuak, Quebec, Canada (ET, bordering on Dfc)
 Iqaluit, Nunavut, Canada (ET)
 Ittoqqortoormiit, Greenland (ET)
 Jungfraujoch, Switzerland (ET)
 Kasprowy Wierch, Poland (ET)
 Kerguelen Islands (ET)
 Macquarie Island, Australia (ET)
 Mount Fuji, Japan (ET)
 Mount Rainier (slopes), Washington, United States (ET)
 Mount Washington, New Hampshire, United States (ET, bordering on Dfc)
 Mount Wellington, Tasmania, Australia (ET)
 Murghab, Tajikistan (ET)
 Mykines, Faroe Islands (ET, bordering on Cfc)
 Mys Shmidta, Russia (ET)
 Nagqu, China (ET, bordering on Dwc)
 Novaya Zemlya, Arkhangelsk Oblast, Russia (ET)
 Nuuk, Greenland (ET)
 Prince Edwards Islands (ET)
 Puno, Peru (ET, bordering on Cwc)
 Stanley, Falkland Islands (ET, bordering on Cfc)
 Svalbard, Norway (ET)
 Ushuaia, Argentina (ET, bordering on Cfc)
 Yu Shan, Taiwan (ET)
 Zugspitze, Bavaria, Germany (ET)

EF: Ice cap climate 
Ice cap climate (EF): This climate is dominant in Antarctica, inner Greenland, and summits of many high mountains, even at lower latitudes. Monthly average temperatures never exceed 0 °C (32 °F).

Examples

 Aconcagua, Chile/Argentina (EF)
 Amundsen–Scott Station, Antarctica (EF)
 Byrd Station, Antarctica (EF)
 Concordia Station, Antarctica (EF)
 Denali, Alaska, United States (EFH)
 Dome Fuji, Antarctica (EF)
 Ismoil Somoni Peak, Tajikistan (EF)
 Jengish Chokusu, China/Kyrgyzstan (EF)
 Kangchenjunga, India/Nepal (EF) 
 K2, China/Pakistan (EF)
 Lhotse, Nepal (EFH)
 Makalu, Nepal/China (EF)
 McMurdo Station, Antarctica (EF)
 Mount Ararat, Turkey (EF)
 Mount Everest, China/Nepal (EF)
 Mount Logan, Canada (EF)
 Mount Rainier (summit), Washington, United States (EF)
 Plateau Station, Antarctica (EF)
 Scott Base, Antarctica (EF)
 Showa Station, Antarctica (EF)
 Summit Camp, Greenland (EF)
 Ushakov Island, Russia (EF)
 Vostok Station, Antarctica (EF)

Ecological significance

Biomass 
The Köppen climate classification is based on the empirical relationship between climate and vegetation. This classification provides an efficient way to describe climatic conditions defined by temperature and precipitation and their seasonality with a single metric. Because climatic conditions identified by the Köppen classification are ecologically relevant, it has been widely used to map the geographic distribution of long-term climate and associated ecosystem conditions.

Climate change 
Over recent years, there has been an increasing interest in using the classification to identify changes in climate and potential changes in vegetation over time. The most important ecological significance of the Köppen climate classification is that it helps to predict the dominant vegetation type based on the climatic data and vice versa.

In 2015, a Nanjing University paper published in Scientific Reports analyzing climate classifications found that between 1950 and 2010, approximately 5.7% of all land area worldwide had moved from wetter and colder classifications to drier and hotter classifications. The authors also found that the change "cannot be explained as natural variations but are driven by anthropogenic factors."

A 2018 Nature study provides detailed maps for present and future Köppen-Geiger climate classification maps at 1-km resolution.

Other Köppen climate maps 
All maps use the ≥0 °C (or >-3 °C) definition for temperate climates, the 18 °C (or >0 °C or >-3 °C) annual mean temperature threshold to distinguish between hot and cold dry climates, and solely 18 °C for tropical climates.

See also 
 Trewartha climate classification
 Holdridge life zones
 Hardiness zone

References

External links 

 World Map of the Köppen–Geiger climate classification for the period 1951–2000 (archived 6 September 2010)
 Global climate maps, using Köppen classification (FAO, 1999)

Climate records 
 IPCC Data Distribution Center (archived)

 
Climate and weather classification systems